Helen "Nell" Louise Zink (born 1964) is an American writer living in Germany. After being a long term penpal of Avner Shats, she came to prominence in her fifties with the help of Jonathan Franzen and her novel, Mislaid, was longlisted for the National Book Award. The Wallcreeper was released in the United States by the independent press Dorothy and named one of 100 notable books of 2014 by The New York Times. Zink then released Nicotine, Private Novelist and Doxology, all published by Ecco Press.

Writing career
After fifteen years spent writing fiction exclusively for a single penpal, the Israeli postmodernist Avner Shats, Zink caught the attention of Jonathan Franzen with a letter promoting the work of the German ornithologist Martin Schneider-Jacoby and asking for his help to save birds in the Balkans. The two writers began a correspondence, and Franzen was surprised to learn that Zink had no published literary work. Zink comments:

I was so tired of Franzen saying that I should take myself seriously as a writer and I wanted to make very clear that there's a very clear distinction between taking your career seriously and taking your writing seriously. So I wrote the first part of a new novel, called The Wallcreeper, in just four days to show him that I knew what I was doing as a writer.

In early 2012, Zink sent Franzen her collected manuscripts. Franzen tried unsuccessfully to interest publishers in her 1998 novel Sailing Towards the Sunset by Avner Shats (sic). It was Franzen's agent who finally negotiated a six-figure publishing deal for Zink's Mislaid. Meanwhile, The Wallcreeper was published independently in the United States in 2014 by Dorothy, a publishing project. Reviewing it in The New York Times Robin Romm wrote "Zink's work may be, at times, cerebral and a little distancing, but its vitality and purpose are invigorating." and that, "The passages about European environmental groups, government programs and methods of protest are less universal and more like amusement for insiders -- more like the impromptu they started as, in other words." Overall she compliments the book on its humor, liveliness, and critique of humanity's "mindless consumption". Kirkus Reviews called it "a brief yet masterful novel of epic breadth." It was listed as one of the 100 notable books of 2014 by The New York Times.

Zink's second novel, Mislaid (Ecco Press), her first under a major publisher, follows the story of a white lesbian, Peggy, later 'Meg', born in rural Virginia in the 1960s. Peggy leaves her marriage to her gay professor, and with the help of a stolen birth certificate, creates a new African-American identity for herself and her daughter, Mireille/Karen. Though Dwight Garner called the book "a minor and misshapen novel from a potentially major voice," he later named it among his top ten books for the year. Walter Kirn, in The New York Times Book Review, found it a "provocative masquerade with heart," identifying an "elegance and confidence that are exceptionally rare now." New York Times Magazine writer Daniel J. Sharfstein has observed that while Zink's plot may be "over-the-top," the real-life case of former NAACP chapter president Rachel Dolezal bears a remarkable parallel. novelist. Mislaid, was longlisted for the National Book Award.

Nicotine was published in 2016. In Joe Dunthorne's review he says, "there is a recklessness and a freshness to this complex tale that is at its best when its elements of horror and humor collide." In a New York Times book review, Dwight Garner praises the book, saying, "I could listen to Ms Zink's dialogue all day; she may be, at heart, a playwright."

In a book review about Mislaid by Walter Kirn, he admits that toward the end of the novel, "Piquancy and intimacy are lost, sacrificed to momentum and high mayhem. The damage isn't fatal, though; the novel's charm and intelligence ran deep." Overall, he compliments the book's pace and "sharp observations" made by her narration.

Personal life
Zink was born in California in 1964 and raised in rural Virginia, a setting she draws on in her novel Mislaid. She attended Stuart Hall School and the College of William and Mary, where she earned a B.A. in Philosophy.

In 1993, while living in Hoboken, New Jersey, Zink founded a zine called Animal Review, which ran until 1997 and "featured submissions and interviews with punk musicians about their pets, from King Crimson guitarist Robert Fripp writing about his rabbit Beaton Bunnerius Bun, to Jon Langford, of British punk band The Mekons, discussing his loach fish." Zink has worked as a secretary at Colgate-Palmolive, and as a technical writer in Tel Aviv. She has worked in construction, waited tables and was a secretary before working as a translator. "There's never a market for true art," Zink told an interviewer from The Paris Review, "so my main concern was always to have a job that didn't require me to write or think."

Zink moved to Germany in May 2000, eventually earning a PhD in Media Studies from the University of Tübingen. She has worked as a translator for Zeitenspiegel agency. She lives in Bad Belzig. Zink has been married and divorced twice. On May 8, 1990, she eloped with Benjamin A. Burck in a "very simple civil ceremony" at the Henrico County Courthouse in Richmond, Virginia; they divorced in 1996.
She later married the Israeli composer and poet Zohar Eitan in 1996.

Bibliography

Novels
 The Wallcreeper (200 pages, Dorothy, a publishing project, 2014)
 Mislaid (256 pages, Ecco Press, 2015)
 Nicotine (304 pages, Ecco Press, 2016)
 Private Novelist (336 pages, Ecco Press, 2016)
Doxology (416 pages, Ecco Press, 2019)
Avalon (224 pages, Alfred A. Knopf, 2022)

Short fiction

 Zink, Nell (2017). "Bonebreaker". Harper's, June 2017.
Zink, Nell (2019). "Marmalade Sky". Harper's, July 2019.

Essays 

 Zink, Nell (2019). "The Bird Angle". Harper's, November 2019.
 Zink, Nell (2020). "This Babushka Has Talons". n+1, January 2020.

Liner notes
 Two Originals of Tom Liwa, 2002

Critical studies and reviews

Schwartz, Madeleine (September 2019). "Nell Zink's Satire Raises the Stakes". The New Yorker. September 2, 2019 Issue.

References

External links 
 "Animal Review / Fanzine of Herbivorous Youth" a fanzine edited by and partly written by Zink
 Articles by Zink for the journal n+1
 "The Westmoreland Journal, May 15, 1990"
 "The Guardian"

1964 births
Living people
21st-century American novelists
21st-century American women writers
American women novelists
College of William & Mary alumni
University of Tübingen alumni
Novelists from California
Novelists from Virginia
20th-century American novelists
20th-century American women writers